Joseph Edwin Johnson (born July 9, 1933) is an American academic. He served as the president of University of Tennessee system from 1991 to 1999. He is an alumnus of Birmingham–Southern College and the University of Tennessee. He is also a 1951 graduate of Hueytown High School in Hueytown, Alabama where his fellow high school seniors accurately voted him "most likely to succeed."

References

1933 births
Living people
Presidents of the University of Tennessee system
University of Tennessee alumni
Birmingham–Southern College alumni
Hueytown High School alumni